Wirthiotrema xanthopustulatum is a species of corticolous (bark-dwelling) lichen in the family Graphidaceae. Found in Brazil, it was formally described as a new species in 2021 by lichenologists André Aptroot and Maria Fernanda de Souza. The type specimen was collected in Tagaçaba Porto da Linha (Guaraqueçaba, Paraná) on tree bark. It contains the secondary compounds protocetraric acid and lichexanthone. This latter compound causes the lichen thallus to fluoresce a yellow colour when shone with a long-wavelength UV light. Wirthiotrema santessonii is similar in appearance, but it contains stictic acid rather than protocetraric acid and lichexanthone.

References

Graphidaceae
Lichen species
Lichens described in 2021
Lichens of South Brazil
Taxa named by André Aptroot